2018 Champions League may refer to:

Football
2017–18 UEFA Champions League
2018–19 UEFA Champions League
2018 AFC Champions League
2018 CAF Champions League